The following is a list of events affecting Philippine television in 2018. Events listed include television show debuts, finales, cancellations, and channel launches, closures and rebrandings, as well as information about controversies and carriage disputes.

Events

January
 January 15 – ABS-CBN Regional Channel and Tag has ceased broadcasting due to a change in business direction of Creative Programs Inc.
 January 16 – A day after a change in business direction of Creative Programs Inc., Liga started its official broadcast as features the latest and classic sporting events from ABS-CBN Sports. Also as the official broadcaster of 2018 FIFA World Cup. Since the revival of their former channel, Balls went off-the-air two years of absence and a day absorbed to S+A HD which is now under their simulcast feed. The first test broadcast was launched on January 1.
 January 26 - SatLite was launched as a secondary direct-to-home satellite provider by Cignal TV.
 January 31 – After 12 years of broadcasting, Filipino-dubbed anime channel Hero has ceased broadcasting due to lack of advertising support and change in business direction of Creative Programs Inc. immediately after Tag and ABS-CBN Regional Channel went off-the-air 15 days earlier. Meanwhile, it relaunched as a digital media online portal under ABS-CBN Digital Media on February 7.

February
 February 1 – Ovation Productions, Inc. launched its subsidiary, "TAP Digital Media Ventures Corporation" (TAP DMV), a private media company that feature some content of programs for entertainment, news and sports, among others which offered world-class across the globe on its owned pay TV channels and over-the-top media service partnered with other broadcasters through agreement rights.
 February 12 – Light Network was renamed back as Light TV with its new slogan "God's Channel of Blessings".
 February 17 – TV5 unveiled a new logo, a relaunched name as The 5 Network or simply 5, and a slogan or station ID entitled Get It on 5, whereas the TV on the northeastern quadrant of the logo has been dropped, making it more flexible for the other divisions to use it as part of their own identity. Along with the rebranding, TV5's programming grid has also divided into five blocks: ESPN 5 (Sports), News 5 (News and Information), On 5 (Entertainment, Animation, Japanese anime, Blocktimers and Home Shopping), D5 Studio (Digital Content) and Studio 5 (World-class Filipino productions for audiences across all platforms). In addition, the movie block Movie Max 5 was quickly retired a week before its rebranding and the Saturday night movie block Sine Squad was expanded into a daily strip; with the Saturday night portion was remained Sine Squad Prime on the same day.

March
 March 27 – Major networks GMA Network Inc. and ABS-CBN Corporation issued a joint statement regarding their differences related to their news reports on the latter's AM radio station DZMM during the Pacquiao-Mosley fight In 2011 based on their news on the former network's live TV broadcast (which is leased their airtime to the network by Solar Entertainment for this fight at that time) with some portions of the latter's news reports containing updates and descriptions of the fight; GMA issued a file an intellectual property violation complaint against ABS-CBN before the Intellectual Property Office. The 2 networks placed their Paid advertisement regarding the statement in the Manila Bulletin on the said date.
 March 28 – ABS-CBN Corporation launched "Star Hunt", a search program for Filipinos who want to appear or participate on any various programming shows such as talent and reality, which produced by ABS-CBN through nationwide and worldwide area auditions, as well as "Star Hunt Academy", a boot camp that giving opportunities for their scouting pool of aspiring rosters especially for the talent members through workshops to include in the network's different platforms beginning on April 20.
 March 31 – Toonami has ceased broadcast in Southeast Asia after 5 years of broadcasting.

April
 April 1–2 – News Patrol, TV Patrol, Umagang Kay Ganda, The Score and Bandila started to broadcast in full high definition after years of broadcasting in standard definition format.
 April 2 – After 18 years, Lifestyle becomes Metro Channel. A relaunch of the female-oriented cable channel from Creative Programs, Inc. and the content provider based on Metro, the Philippines' popular monthly lifestyle magazine from ABS-CBN Publishing and its digital media platform. The channel also launched in full high definition on March 15 during its early test broadcast.
 April 12 – Ika-6 na Utos actress Ryza Cenon transferred to ABS-CBN after leaving GMA.
 April 19 – During the company's annual stockholders meeting, the ABS-CBN board of directors voted in favor and elected Eugenio "Gabby" Lopez III as the chairman Emeritus and his cousin, Chief Technology Officer Martin "Mark" Lopez as his successor as Chairman of the network. Gabby Lopez will be the second executive to be elected as chairman Emeritus, succeeded his late father, Eugenio "Geny" Lopez, Jr.
 April 29 – Kristel de Catalina, spiral pole dance from Antipolo, Rizal, wins the sixth season of Pilipinas Got Talent, the grand finals of which were held at the Bren Z. Guiao Sports Complex and Convention Center in San Fernando City, Pampanga.
 April 30 – The Department of Tourism receives their P 60,000,000 ad placement given to government-owned People's Television Network for airing it on Ben Tulfo's program Kilos Pronto produced by Bitag Media Unilimted, Inc. (in which the blocktimer sells its production time to the network); the contract was not supported with proper documents such as the Memorandum of Agreement and Certificate of Performance contrary to Section 4 of Presidential Decree 1445 and COA Circular No. 2012-001. An investigation on the alleged advertisement anomaly is being conducted by Malacanang, Tourism secretary Wanda Tulfo Teo said that Ben along with his brother Erwin Tulfo will return its P 60 million ad placement from DOT to prove there was no anomaly in the advertisement deal and there was no conflict on the deal because it was a government-to-government deal between the DOT and PTV. Teo was later resigned on May 8 because of the controversy.

May
 May 4 – Philippine Islands Assassins was crowned as the first-ever The Will to Win grand winner of Wowowin, the grand finals of which were held at Kia Theater (now New Frontier Theater), Quezon City.
 May 25
 Solar Entertainment Corporation formally launched its premium digital terrestrial television brand, Easy TV Home Super Digibox, and began conducting its official test broadcast.
 DisneyLife, a streaming service owned by The Walt Disney Company, was launched and became available in the Philippines.
 May 26 – Samm Alvero and Kaye Reyes were named as the new MYX VJs at the end of MYX VJ Search 2018.
 May 27 – After 2 years and 7 months, Bloomberg TV Philippines ceased its broadcast at midnight due to higher license fees.
 May 28 – One News starts its official launch of localized news channel in partnership with MVP-owned media properties News5, The Philippine Star, BusinessWorld, Bloomberg TV Philippines and content provider Probe Productions. Bloomberg-produced programs will be still be carried by One News.

June
 June 2 – Janine Berdin from Lapu-Lapu City was hailed as It's Showtime's Tawag ng Tanghalan Year 2 Grand Champion. It was held at Aliw Theater, Pasay.
 June 5
 After more than 12 years of broadcast, 2nd Avenue on RJTV 29 ceased broadcast at 1:00 AM along with the end of blocktime agreements with Solar Entertainment Corporation and Rajah Broadcasting Network. Meanwhile, the other provincial cable entities will still carry 2nd Avenue's broadcast, with the airing of marathons of some of the programs until June 30, 2018, at 2:00 AM. Several programs from this channel will be transferred to ETC and Jack TV starting June 6, 2018.
 RJTV became the second broadcaster to completely switch off its analog transmission. RJTV is also shutting down its digital transmission temporarily for having its huge plans on digital television. The newly reformatted channel began airing at 12 midnight on major cable operators, with TV Shop Philippines, as its first program to air during the test broadcast on the newly launched channel, followed by re-run of some of the local programs aired on RJTV including Pinoy Wrestling.
 June 8 - Cignal TV launched eGG Network on their line-up.
 June 30 - Juliana Parizcova Segovia was hailed as the first ever Miss Q & A on It's Showtime. It was held at the Newport Performing Arts Theater, Resorts World Manila.

July
 July 7 – Eat Bulaga! began the countdown to their 40th anniversary celebration which will held on July 30, 2019, through EB Version 4.0.
 July 15 – ABS-CBN, GMA Network and The 5 Network airs the boxing match between Manny Pacquiao and Argentinian boxer Lucas Matthysse, billed as the "Fight of Champions" which took place at Axiata Arena in Kuala Lumpur, Malaysia. It will be the first Pacquiao fight to be broadcast in high definition for the former network. The boxing match is also broadcast live on pay-per-view through ABS-CBN's subsidiary company Sky Cable and The 5 Network's sister company Cignal and on radio via GMA's AM radio station DZBB-AM, FM radio station DWLS and its network of AM radio stations; with rebroadcasts on the former's sister network S+A, the latter's cable channel Hyper and Solar Sports (who is formerly aired the Pacquiao fights from 2002 to 2016 and they previously sub-licensed the fights for over-the-air television with ABS-CBN from 2005 to 2006 and GMA from 2007 to 2016). The three networks was have previously involved in the roadblock airing of his match against Floyd Mayweather Jr. billed as "The Fight of the Century", or the "Battle for Greatness" with Solar Entertainment Corporation in May 2015.
 July 21 – Lauren Madeleine Cabuguas (Mini Kim Chiu) hailed as the MiniMe season 3 grand winner on It's Showtime.
 July 30 – ABS-CBN Corporation officially launched its two new additional digital terrestrial television channels on ABS-CBN TV Plus: Asianovela Channel, the country's first all-day Filipino-dubbed Asian drama channel that focused on highly acclaimed drama series from South Korea, Taiwan and China as well as Movie Central, an all-day movie channel that includes a line-up of Hollywood blockbuster movies. Aside from two new channels, three additional existing cable channels: Jeepney TV, Myx and O Shopping, are also included for ongoing free trial basis exclusively for ABS-CBN TV Plus subscribers in selected areas only.

August
 August 5 – People's Television Network airs a mistake of showing a photo of a People’s Liberation Army Navy Type 054A Jiangkai II-class vessel with the Philippine flag waving in their story on President Rodrigo Duterte's statement on his plan to send a Philippine Navy ship to Libya to help rescue Filipino hostages abducted by terrorists, which is aired on the network's weekend newscast Ulat Bayan and on the network's Facebook page. The network has removed their Facebook post on August 7 and they apologized “for the inadvertent use of wrong photos” for the story.
 August 13–14 - FPJ's Ang Probinsyano production team was called out online by fans of the spouses Dingdong Dantes and Marian Rivera over the alleged unauthorized usage of the spouses' family pictures. The controversy first began gaining steam when a Twitter fan site dedicated to the spouse' daughter Zia, ZiaDantesFanSite posted a video with the caption “Zia's photo was unethically used by ‘Ang Probinsyano’ in Nov 2017. In last night's episode, [Dingdong and Marian] DongYan's photo was edited and used again by the show. Were the photos of Dingdong, Marian and Zia used [and] edited without permission? Dear Ang Probinsyano, strike two na po kayo ah.” which was quickly shared by other users and from which Dantes possibly gained knowledge of such usage. Dantes' response to the controversy was posted on his Facebook account "Courtesy and fair practice must always be observed especially in an established industry like ours. But whether or not it is done within the entertainment sector, we should always be reminded of the basic etiquette for online photo use and sharing that includes asking permission and/or citing sources. I do hope that this won't happen again to anyone." he wrote. In the same post, Dantes also shared an excerpt of his letter to the production team dated August 11, 2018 which read “I appreciate that you found artistic inspiration from the original photos. Unfortunately, there is the inescapable consequence that legal and moral rights were violated here. And as you may very well be aware of, established industry practice is against such act as it amounts to disrespect. Worst of all, as a father and husband, I cannot help but feel offended and deeply hurt by such actions, which happened not just once, but twice. Basic rules of courtesy in this case dictate that you first secure permission from the photographer and my Family.” On the following day, the production team of FPJ's Ang Probinsyano released a statement apologizing to Dantes and his family. The statement explained that the production team hired a third-party contractor to create the props for the show, of which they were neither aware that the photograph belonged to Dantes nor was it intended to disrespect or offend Dantes and his family. The producers added that they have already launched an investigation "to prevent a similar incident from happening in the future." Alice Dixson, likewise offered her apology to Dantes.
 August 15 - BEAM TV terminated eGG Network on their line-upon its digital subchannel line-up due to the review of the provider's decision. Meanwhile, eGG Network continued to air via Cignal TV.
 August 19 – The TNT Boys (Keifer Sanchez, Mackie Empuerto and Francis Concepcion) of Manila, Philippines won as the second Your Face Sounds Familiar Kids Season 2 grand winner.
 August 21 – Diyos at Bayan celebrated its 20th anniversary on Philippine television.

September
 September 5 – Actor Rayver Cruz transferred from ABS-CBN back to his original station, GMA Network.
 September 24 – Eat Bulaga! introduced their new segment which is a franchise and adaptation of an Israeli series, BOOM! produced by Keshet International.
 September 28 – Since 2015, FPJ's Ang Probinsyano celebrated its 3rd anniversary on television.
 September 29 – Mandarhyme from Mandaluyong emerged as the first-ever HypeBest Grand Winner, and they joined Vice Ganda to sing the official theme song of the upcoming movie, Fantastica on It's Showtime.
 September 30 – Golden Cañedo of Cebu City was proclaimed as the champion of The Clash.

October
 October 1 - After 19 years of broadcast, Net 25 shut down its analog signal. It became the third broadcaster to completely switch off its analog transmission.
 October 16 – After 18 months of carriage disputes, both Solar Entertainment Corporation channels Basketball TV and NBA Premium TV were returned to Sky Cable, Sky Direct & Sky On Demand. The announcement comes one day before the official start of the league's 2018–19 season.
 October 17 – Singer and actress Regine Velasquez-Alcasid transferred from GMA Network back to her original station, ABS-CBN.
 October 20 – Team Karylle and Jhong hailed as It's Showtime's ninth anniversary (Magpasikat 2018: And 9... Thank You!) champion.
 October 23 – ABS-CBN celebrated its 65th anniversary of Philippine television.
 October 27 – Shaila Rebortera (from Cebu) was crowned as Miss Millennial Philippines 2018 of noontime show, Eat Bulaga!.
 October 28 - After only 2 weeks into the league's 2018–19 season, Basketball TV and NBA Premium TV were removed again from Sky Cable and Sky Direct.

November
 November 3 – Santos Family won as the first-ever The Kids' Choice grand winner.
 November 4 – Elsa Droga & Raprap Family won as the first-ever The Kids' Choice: Celebrity Edition grand winner.
 November 11 – "Sa Mga Bituin Na Lang Ibubulong", a song entry composed by Kyle Raphael Borbon and interpreted by JM de Guzman was named as Himig Handog 2018 grand winner held at ABS-CBN. This was aired on "ASAP".
 November 16 - ABS-CBN's over-the-top content platform service formerly known as "iWant TV" was officially relaunched as iWant, as the latter now emphasizes on adding original content similar to Netflix, starting with Spirits: Reawaken (a reboot version of the original 2004–2005 series), Quezon's Game, and Alamat ng Ano. Glorious and MA are the first two original movies of iWant.
 November 30 – ABS-CBN Mobile ceased its mobile network-sharing agreement and services between ABS-CBN and Globe Telecom. As earlier on the third quarter of 2018, they have officially announced that they would not renew their network-sharing agreement after assessing its mobile business model as financially unsustainable. The two companies will remain committed for partnership for content sharing using its existing resources.

December
 December 1 - After 17 years of broadcast, Hope Channel Philippines shuts down in analog signal. It became the fourth broadcaster to completely switch off its analog transmission.
 December 8 - After 23 years, Eat Bulaga! transfers their new studio from Broadway Centrum to APT Studios in Cainta, Rizal.
 December 12 - ABS-CBN inaugurated its 7.7 land hectare multipurpose complex called Horizon IT Park (also known as ABS-CBN City) located at San Jose del Monte, Bulacan. The Phase 1 of the project includes its first two state-of-the-art sound stages (dubbed as ABS-CBN Soundstage) with each new studio sized at 1,500 square meters, which is on par with Hollywood standards namely, The EL3 Stage (named after its chairman emeritus, Eugenio Lopez III, who visioned of the new studios) and Stage 2. The property hub also includes backlots, production and post-production facilities, and offices.
 December 17 – Catriona Elisa Gray, representing from Oas, Albay, Luzon, Philippines was named as Miss Universe 2018 held at IMPACT Arena, Muang Thong Thani in Nonthaburi Province, northern suburb of Bangkok, Thailand.
 December 25 - Nueva Ecija Singing Ambassadors was crowned as the first-ever Christmas Chorale-Lolling grand winner on Wowowin.
 December 30–31 - Ultimate Fighting Championship ends of its 3-year broadcast rights with The 5 Network's sports division ESPN 5 and pay television network provider, Hyper. Their final broadcast on both networks was UFC 232: Jones vs. Gustafsson 2. After this, It was announced that Fox Networks Group Asia through its sports channel Fox Sports Asia and their digital streaming service Fox+ will be the new home for the UFC starting in the following year; which will ending the localized blackout of UFC fights for the network. Later in the following month, FNGA has subcontracting ESPN5 to carrying the free-to-air rights of the fights on a tape-delay, immediately after its live broadcast on the streaming service, which is as a result of its purchase by Disney in March of the same year.

Unknown (dates)
 Cignal TV launched "Cignal Play", a video-on-demand and linear programming web platform that carried some movies and series, as well as livestreaming of some TV channels that also broadcast on Cignal's line-up.

Debuts

ABS-CBN

The following are programs that debuted on ABS-CBN:

Re-runs
 May 6: Kung Fu Panda: Legends of Awesomeness (season 1)
 November 11: Avatar: The Legend of Korra (season 1)

GMA

The following are programs that debuted on GMA Network:

Re-runs
 February 24: Angry Birds Toons with Stella and Piggy Tales
 March 24: My Little Pony: Friendship is Magic
 July 30: Voltes V (2017 reboot dub)
 September 24: Daimos (2017 reboot dub)
 September 29: Grami's Circus Show

5 (The 5 Network)

The following are programs that debuted on The 5 Network:

Re-runs

 Notes
^  Originally aired on ABS-CBN
^  Originally aired on S+A
^  Originally aired on AksyonTV
^  Originally aired on ETC
^  Originally aired on Jack TV

PTV

The following are programs that debuted on People's Television Network:

Other channels
The following are programs that debuted on other minor channels and video streaming services:

Re-runs

 Notes
^  Originally aired on ABS-CBN
^  Originally aired on GMA
^  Originally aired on The 5 Network
^  Originally aired on Cine Mo!
^  Originally aired on Yey!
^  Originally aired on S+A
^  Originally aired on Jeepney TV
^  Originally aired on Sari-Sari Channel
^  Originally aired on Hero (now defunct)
^  Originally aired on ETC
^  Originally aired on Jack TV
^  Originally aired on 2nd Avenue (now defunct)
^  Originally aired on CT (now defunct)
^  Originally aired on Studio 23 (now S+A)
^  Originally aired on Q (now GMA News TV)
^  Originally aired on C/S 9 (now CNN Philippines)

Specials

Returning or renamed programs

Major networks

Other channels

Programs transferring networks

Major networks

Other channels

Milestone episodes
The following shows made their Milestone episodes in 2018:

Finales

ABS-CBN

The following are programs that ended on ABS-CBN:

Stopped airing

GMA

The following are programs that ended on GMA Network:

Stopped airing

5 (The 5 Network)

The following are programs that ended on The 5 Network:

Stopped airing

PTV

The following are programs that ended on People's Television Network:

 January 14: Alagang Magaling
 April 29: ITravelPinas
 May 5: Like Pinas (season 2)
 July 1: Buhay Abroad
 June 29: Oras ng Katotohanan
 December 29: Tahor: Your Ultimate Gamefowl Show
 December 30: TV Shop Philippines

Other channels

Unknown (dates)
 ETC Flix on ETC

Stopped airing
 May 7–18: Mamaw-in-Law on GMA News TV (reason: Program pre-empted by 700 Club Asia live telethon TV special.)
 August 13–24: Saimdang: Soulmates Across Time on GMA News TV (reason: Program pre-empted by 700 Club Asia live telethon TV special.)
 September 2: ASAP: Encore on Jeepney TV (reason: Program replaced by Star Hunt: The Grand Audition Show encore. The program continued on January 6, 2019.)
 November 25: Adventure Time on CNN Philippines (reason: Season 1 run only. Program replaced by Wholesome Meals, Better Life. Program continued on February 2, 2019.)

Networks

The following are a list of free-to-air and cable channels or networks launches and closures in 2018.

Launches

Stations changing network affiliation
The following is a list of television stations that have made or will make noteworthy affiliation switches in 2018.

Rebranded
The following is a list of cable channels that have made or will make noteworthy network rebranded in 2018.

Closures

Awards
 October 14: 32nd PMPC Star Awards for Television, organized by Philippine Movie Press Club

Deaths
January
 January 14 – Spanky Manikan (b. 1942), actor
 January 27 – Maryo J. de los Reyes (b. 1952), film and television director

February
 February 7 – Argel Joseph, (b. 1943), film and television director

March
 March 8 – Bernardo Bernardo (b. 1945), actor
 March 15 – Rolly Quizon (b. 1958), actor, former cast member of John en Marsha and son of the late comedy icon, Dolphy
 March 24 – Mely Tagasa (b. 1935), actress and comedian

August
 August 19 – Christopher Ad Castillo (b. 1964), movie and television director

October
 October 10 – Manolito Cruz, President and CEO, IBC-13
 October 30 – Rico J. Puno (b. 1953), singer and actor

November
 November 6 – Bangkay (b. 1947), actor
 November 21 - TJ Cruz (b. 1981), former mainstay of Ang TV and son of film/TV actor, Tirso Cruz III

December
 December 14 - Gilberto Duavit Sr. (b. 1934), chairman, GMA Network

See also
2018 in television

References

 
Television in the Philippines by year
Philippine television-related lists